A lunisolar calendar is a calendar in many cultures, combining lunar calendars and solar calendars. The date of Lunisolar calendars therefore indicates both the Moon phase and the time of the solar year, that is the position of the Sun in the Earth's sky. If the sidereal year (such as in a sidereal solar calendar) is used instead of the solar year, then the calendar will predict the constellation near which the full moon may occur. As with all calendars which divide the year into months there is an additional requirement that the year have a whole number of months. In this case ordinary years consist of twelve months but every second or third year is an embolismic year, which adds a thirteenth intercalary, embolismic, or leap month.

Their months are based on the regular cycle of the Moon's phases. So lunisolar calendars are lunar calendars with – in contrast to them – additional intercalation rules being used to bring them into a rough agreement with the solar year and thus with the seasons.

The main other type of calendar is a solar calendar.

Examples
The Chinese, Buddhist, Burmese, Assyrian,
Hebrew, Jain and Kurdish as well as the traditional Hindu,  Japanese, Korean, Mongolian, Tibetan, and Vietnamese calendars (in the East Asian Chinese cultural sphere), plus the ancient Hellenic, Coligny, and Babylonian calendars are all lunisolar. Also, some of the ancient pre-Islamic calendars in south Arabia followed a lunisolar system. The Chinese, Coligny and
Hebrew lunisolar calendars track more or less the tropical year whereas the Buddhist and Hindu lunisolar calendars track the sidereal year. Therefore, the first three give an idea of the seasons whereas the last two give an idea of the position among the constellations of the full moon. The Tibetan calendar was influenced by the Buddhist calendar. The Germanic peoples also used a lunisolar calendar before their conversion to Christianity.

Chinese lunisolar calendar

The Chinese calendar or Chinese lunisolar calendar is also called Agricultural Calendar [農曆; 农历; Nónglì; 'farming calendar'], or Yin Calendar [陰曆; 阴历; Yīnlì; 'yin calendar']), based on the concept of Yin Yang and astronomical phenomena, as movements of the sun, moon, Mercury, Venus, Mars, Jupiter and Saturn (known as the seven luminaries) are the references for the Chinese lunisolar calendar calculations.

The earliest record of the Chinese lunisolar calendar is the Zhou Dynasty (1050 BC – 771 BC). Throughout history, the Chinese lunisolar calendar had many variations and evolved with different dynasties with increasing accuracy, including the "six ancient calendars" in the Warring States Period, the Qin calendar in the Qin Dynasty, the Han calendar or the Taichu calendar in the Han Dynasty and Tang Dynasty, the Shoushi calendar in the Yuan Dynasty, and the Daming calendar in the Ming Dynasty, etc. Starting 1912, the solar calendar is used together with the lunar calendar in China.

The most celebrated Chinese holidays, like the Spring Festival, or the Chinese New Year, Lantern Festival, Mid-Autumn Festival, Dragon Boat Festival, Qingming Festival, etc. are all based on the Chinese lunisolar calendar. And the popular Chinese zodiac is a classification scheme based on the Chinese calendar that assigns an animal and its reputed attributes to each year in a repeating twelve-year cycle.

Movable feasts in the Christian calendars, related to the lunar cycle
The Gregorian calendar (the world's most commonly used) is a solar one but the Western Christian churches use a lunar-based algorithm to determine the date of Easter and consequent movable feasts. Briefly, the date is determined with respect to the ecclesiastical full moon that follows the ecclesiastical equinox in March. (These events are almost, but not quite, the same as the actual astronomical observations.) The Eastern Christian churches have a similar algorithm that is based on the Julian calendar.

Reconciling lunar and solar cycles

Determining leap months

A tropical year is approximately 365.2422 days long and a synodic month is approximately 29.5306 days long, so a tropical year is approximately  months long. The Babylonians applied the 19-year cycle in the late sixth century BCE.

A tropical year is longer than 12 lunar months and shorter than 13 of them. The arithmetical equation  allows it to be seen that a combination of 12 'short' years (12 months) and 7 'long' years (13 months) will be equal to 19 solar years. Intercalation of leap months is frequently controlled by the "epact", which is the difference between the lunar and solar years (approximately 11 days). The Metonic cycle, used in the Hebrew calendar and the Christian ecclesiastical calendars, adds seven months during every nineteen-year period. The classic Metonic cycle can be reproduced by assigning an initial epact value of 1 to the last year of the cycle and incrementing by 11 each year. Between the last year of one cycle and the first year of the next the increment is 12. When the epact reaches 30 or higher, an intercalary month is added and 30 is subtracted. The intercalary years are numbers 3, 6, 8, 11, 14, 17 and 19. Both the Hebrew calendar and the Julian calendar use this sequence.

The Buddhist and Hebrew calendars restrict the leap month to a single month of the year; the number of common months between leap months is, therefore, usually 36, but occasionally only 24 months. Because the Chinese and Hindu lunisolar calendars allow the leap month to occur after or before (respectively) any month but use the true apparent motion of the Sun, their leap months do not usually occur within a couple of months of perihelion, when the apparent speed of the Sun along the ecliptic is fastest (now about 3 January). This increases the usual number of common months between leap months to roughly 34 months when a doublet of common years occurs, while reducing the number to about 29 months when only a common singleton occurs.

With uncounted time
An alternative way of dealing with the fact that a solar year does not contain an integer number of lunar months is by including uncounted time in a period of the year that is not assigned to a named month. Some Coast Salish peoples used a calendar of this kind. For instance, the Chehalis began their count of lunar months from the arrival of spawning chinook salmon (in Gregorian calendar October), and counted 10 months, leaving an uncounted period until the next chinook salmon run.

List of lunisolar calendars   
The following is a list of lunisolar calendars sorted by family.

 Babylonian calendar family – common use of the Metonic cycle
 Ancient Macedonian calendar
 Hebrew calendar
 Umma calendar
 Hindu calendar family – shared astronomical roots
 Assamese calendar
 Bengali calendar
 Burmese calendar
 Chula Sakarat
 Odia calendar
 Thai lunar calendar
 Vikram Samvat
 Chinese calendar family – years start on second new moon after winter solstice (save for leaps)
 Japanese calendar
 Korean calendar
 Mongolian calendar
 Tibetan calendar
 Unclassified or independent
 Attic calendar
 Egyptian calendar, Ptolemaic
 Inca Empire
 Jain calendar
 Celtic calendar, including Coligny calendar
 Javanese calendar
 Muisca calendar
 Nisg̱a'a
 Old Eastern Ojibwe calendar

See also
List of calendars
Metonic cycle
Callippic cycle
Calendar reform
Particular calendars
Hebrew calendar
Hindu calendar
Islamic calendar
Jain calendar
Roman calendar (probably a lunisolar calendar with common years of 355 days and leap years of 378 days.)
Rune calendar
Tamil calendar
Thai calendar

Notes

References

External links

Introduction to Calendars , US Naval Observatory, Astronomical Applications Department.
Lunisolar calendar 2019-2020 (northern hemisphere) by courtesy of Serge Bièvre
Lunisolar Calendar 
Luni-Solar Calendar
Calendar studies

Calendars